The Electric Horseman is a 1979 American western comedy-drama film starring Robert Redford and Jane Fonda and directed by Sydney Pollack. The film is about a former rodeo champion who is hired by a cereal company to become its spokesperson and then runs away on a $12 million electric-lit horse and costume he is given to promote it in Las Vegas after he finds that the horse has been abused.

Plot
Norman "Sonny" Steele is a former championship rodeo rider who has sold out to a business conglomerate and is now reduced to making public appearances to sell a brand of breakfast cereal. Prior to making a Las Vegas promotional appearance to ride the $12 million champion thoroughbred race horse who responds to the name of Rising Star, Sonny discovers to his horror that the horse has been drugged and is injured.

Identifying with the plight of the horse and disillusioned with the present state of his life, Sonny decides to abscond with Rising Star and travel cross-country in order to release him in a remote canyon where herds of wild horses roam. Hallie Martin, a television reporter eager to be the first to break the Rising Star story, locates Sonny and follows him on his unusual quest through the countryside. While en route, the unlikely pair have a romance as they avoid the pursuing authorities.

Cast

Production

Development
Casting for The Electric Horseman either continued or led to many reoccurring collaborations between cast and crew members. On November 28, 1978, Robert Redford was announced to star in the film, becoming the fifth film in which Sydney Pollack directed Redford following This Property Is Condemned (1966), Jeremiah Johnson (1972), The Way We Were (1973) and Three Days of the Condor (1975). This director-actor relationship would continue with two more films: Out of Africa (1985) and Havana (1990). Pollack had also previously directed Fonda in They Shoot Horses, Don't They? (1969), whereas Redford and Fonda previously teamed on The Chase (1966) and Barefoot in the Park (1967).

The Electric Horseman is noted as being the debut acting performance of long-time country and western singer Willie Nelson, who plays the role of Wendell Hickson. According to Pollack, Nelson improvised most of his dialogue in the film. Pollack would later be executive producer for Nelson's 1980 starring vehicle Honeysuckle Rose. The film was also only the second film performance of character actor Wilford Brimley, who would later team with Redford in The Natural (1984).

Filming

Principal photography for The Electric Horseman took place during late 1978 and early 1979 throughout Nevada and Utah. While the film was prominently shot on location in Las Vegas and Red Rock Canyon National Conservation Area, additional filming took place in various locations across the state of Utah, including Grafton, St. George, and Zion National Park.

While filming generally went smoothly, Pollack struggled with revising the script while filming was underway. In addition, there was one particular day in which production was continuously delayed due to traveling thunderstorms that interrupted the 20-second kissing scene between Redford and Fonda. Ultimately, the scene ended up requiring 48 takes that pushed costs to $280,000. The film went over budget by $1.3 million, elevating it to $12.5 million.

Music

The musical score to The Electric Horseman was composed by Dave Grusin. In addition to co-starring, Willie Nelson contributed significantly to the film's soundtrack as well, singing five songs including "My Heroes Have Always Been Cowboys", "Midnight Rider," "Mammas Don't Let Your Babies Grow Up to Be Cowboys," "So You Think You're a Cowboy" and "Hands on the Wheel." Coinciding with the film's release, a soundtrack album was released featuring both Nelson's songs and Grusin's score.

Release and reception
The Electric Horseman was released theatrically in the United States on December 21, 1979. Even with the budget escalating to $12.5 million, the film was a box office success, becoming the eleventh highest grossing film of 1979 after grossing a domestic total of nearly $62 million. While the film was co-produced by Columbia Pictures and Universal Pictures, and distributed by Columbia domestically and Universal internationally, the US film rights would later revert to Universal. It has since been released on CED (Capacitance Electronic Disc) Videodiscs, VHS, Betamax, LaserDisc, DVD and Blu-ray by Universal Studios, although current home video releases have replaced "My Heroes Have Always Been Cowboys" with a generic instrumental sound-alike recording in the opening title sequence.

While the film was a commercial success, it received mixed reviews upon release. Film review aggregate website Rotten Tomatoes reports that 64% of critics gave the film a positive review based on 22 reviews with a "Fresh" rating, with an average score of 5.83/10. The film was also nominated for an Academy Award in 1980 for Best Sound (Arthur Piantadosi, Les Fresholtz, Michael Minkler and Al Overton Jr.).  Gene Siskel of the Chicago Tribune called the film "a nicely polished piece of entertainment from director Sydney Pollack, who regularly works with the biggest of stars and rarely lets his camera get in the way of those stars."  Siskel, who gave the film three stars, highlighted what he detected to be genuine chemistry between Redford and Fonda.  He also lauded the movie's "outstanding secondary cast," including Saxon, Coster and Nelson. Roger Ebert gave the film three out of four stars and called it "the kind of movie they used to make. It's an oddball love story about a guy and a girl and a prize racehorse, and it has a chase scene and some smooching and a happy ending. It could have starred Tracy and Hepburn, or Gable and Colbert, but it doesn't need to because this time it stars Robert Redford and Jane Fonda."

References

External links
 
 
 
 
 Analysis of The Electric Horseman at Transparencynow.com
 

1979 films
1970s adventure films
1979 romantic drama films
1979 Western (genre) films
American adventure films
American adventure drama films
American romantic drama films
Neo-Western films
American chase films
Films scored by Dave Grusin
Films about horses
Films directed by Sydney Pollack
Films set in the Las Vegas Valley
Films shot in Nevada
Films shot in Utah
Columbia Pictures films
Universal Pictures films
1970s English-language films
1970s American films